The men's road race at the 1947 UCI Road World Championships was the 14th edition of the event. The race took place on Sunday 3 August 1947 in Reims, France. The race was won by Theo Middelkamp of the Netherlands.

Final classification

References

Men's Road Race
UCI Road World Championships – Men's road race